In seismology, surface rupture (or ground rupture, or ground displacement) is the visible offset of the ground surface when an earthquake rupture along a fault affects the Earth's surface. Surface rupture is opposed by buried rupture, where there is no displacement at ground level. This is a major risk to any structure that is built across a fault zone that may be active, in addition to any risk from ground shaking. Surface rupture entails vertical or horizontal movement, on either side of a ruptured fault. Surface rupture can affect large areas of land.



Lack of surface rupture

Not every earthquake results in surface rupture, particularly for smaller and deeper earthquakes. In some cases, however, the lack of surface effects is because the fault that moved does not reach the surface.

Where surface rupture occurs

Surface ruptures commonly occur on pre-existing faults. Only rarely are earthquakes (and surface ruptures) associated with faulting on entirely new fault structures. Examples of such earthquakes are San Fernando earthquake, Tabas earthquake, and Chi-Chi earthquake.

In surface rupture earthquakes, the large slips of land are concentrated in the shallow parts of the fault. And, notably, permanent ground displacements which are measureable can be produced by shallow earthquakes, of magnitude M5 and greater.

Types of surface rupture
The form that surface rupturing takes depends on two things: the nature of the material at the surface and the type of fault movement.

Effect of surface lithology
Where there are thick superficial deposits overlying the trace of the faults, the resulting surface effects are typically more discontinuous. Where there is little or no superficial deposits, the surface rupture is generally continuous, except where the earthquake rupture affects more than one fault, which can lead to complex patterns of surface faulting, such as in the 1992 Landers earthquake.

Normal faulting
Surface ruptures associated with normal faults are typically simple fault scarps. Where there are significant superficial deposits, sections with more oblique faulting may form sets of en-echelon scarp segments. Antithetic faults may also develop, giving rise to surface grabens.

Reverse faulting

Reverse faulting (particularly thrust faulting) is associated with more complex surface rupture patterns since the protruding unsupported part of the hanging-wall of the fault is liable to collapse. In addition there may be surface folding and back-thrust development.

Strike-slip faulting

Strike-slip faults are associated with dominantly horizontal movement, leading to relatively simple linear zones of surface rupture where the fault is a simple planar structure. However, many strike-slip faults are formed of overlapping segments, leading to complex zones of normal or reverse faulting depending on the nature of the overlap. Additionally, where there are thick superficial deposits, the rupture typically appears as a set of en-echelon faults.

Mitigation

To retrofit a house to survive surface rupture requires engineered design by geotechnical, and structural or civil engineers. This can be quite expensive.

Examples, with their extent
 1983 Borah Peak earthquake M6.9 in Idaho, normal faulting - 
 1992 Landers earthquake M7.3 in San Bernardino County, California, strike-slip faulting - ,
 1999 İzmit earthquake M7.6 in Turkey, strike-slip faulting - ,
 1999 Jiji earthquake M7.6 in Taiwan, thrust faulting - 
 2001 Kunlun earthquake M7.8 in Tibet, strike-slip faulting - 
 2002 Denali earthquake M7.9 in Alaska, strike-slip faulting - 
 2008 Sichuan earthquake M7.9 in Sichuan, thrust faulting - 
 2023 Turkey–Syria earthquake M7.8 in Turkey, strike-slip faulting -

See also
 Aseismic creep
 Ground fissure

References

External links and references

 A large article about surface rupture

Earthquake and seismic risk mitigation
Seismology
Geological hazards